Platygyra contorta is a species of colonial stony coral in the family Merulinidae. It was described by John Veron in 1990. It has been identified as a least-concern species.

Description
Platygyra contorta is a colonial species found in columnar or encrusting structures. It is light yellow, green, grey, or red in colour, and it has thin walls. Its septa are non-uniform and its valleys are curved and short at the centre of colonies, becoming linear and long at the margins of colonies. Colonies have diameters often exceeding . The species has a similar appearance to Goniastrea deformis and Platygyra verweyi.

Distribution
It is found in the eastern and western Indian Ocean, and the northwestern, eastern central, and western central Pacific Ocean. In Japan, it is common near the mainland (Honshu), and is uncommon in the Ryukyu Islands. It also occurs in Australia, Vietnam, Yemen, Madagascar, Fiji, Thailand, the Marshall Islands, and East Africa. Its population is thought to be decreasing and the species is threatened by climate change, the acidification of oceans, coral disease, fishing, human activities, and bleaching. The species is listed under Appendix II of CITES and has been identified as a least-concern species by the International Union for Conservation of Nature (IUCN).

Taxonomy
Specimens of Platygyra contorta were studied in 1977 but identified as Platygyra rustica. It was first described by John Edward Norwood Veron in 1990.

References

Animals described in 1990
Merulinidae